Malus trilobata, the Lebanese wild apple, erect crab apple or three-lobed apple tree, is a species in the family Rosaceae in the genus Malus. Some authorities place it in the segregate genus Eriolobus, as E. trilobatus.

Description
M. trilobata has an upright habit with horizontal branching and a mature size of  height by  width.

The leaves are maple-like and deeply three-lobed. They turn from orange to red to deep purple in the fall.

The tree blooms during April and May producing white flowers and yellow fruits.

Distribution 
The species' distribution in Asia includes West and South Anatolia, Syria, Lebanon and North Israel, while in Europe its distribution encompasses the east section of Greek Thrace (Evros Prefecture) and southeastern Bulgaria.

The last remaining protected forest community of the endemic wild apple in the country is in the Horsh Ehden nature reserve and the Jabal Moussa Biosphere Reserve.

References

Further reading
"Les Principaux Arbres du Liban"; La Fascicule des Essences Forestieres du Liban. Projet d'assistance a la protection de la couverture vegetale au Liban (Ministry of Agriculture and European Union); 1999.

trilobata
Crabapples